The 2013 Ukrainian Amateur Cup was the eighteenth annual season of Ukraine's football knockout competition for amateur football teams. The competition started on 21 August 2013 and concluded on 2 November 2013.

The cup holders FC Nove Zhyttia Andriivka were defeated by SC Chaika Petropavlivska Borshchahivka in semifinals.

Competition schedule

First qualification round

Second qualification round

Quarterfinals (1/4)

Semifinals (1/2)

Final

See also
 2013 Ukrainian Football Amateur League
 2013–14 Ukrainian Cup

External links
 2013 Ukrainian Amateur Cup at the Footpass (Football Federation of Ukraine)

Ukrainian Amateur Cup
Ukrainian Amateur Cup
Amateur Cup